Emil Bottlang (born 23 December 1912; date of death unknown) is a Swiss canoeist who competed from the late 1930s to the late 1940s. Competing in two Summer Olympics, he earned his best finish of sixth in the folding K-2 10000 m event at Berlin in 1936.

References
Sports-reference.com profile

1912 births
Canoeists at the 1936 Summer Olympics
Canoeists at the 1948 Summer Olympics
Olympic canoeists of Switzerland
Year of death missing
Swiss male canoeists